Vis is a village in the municipality of Ivaylovgrad, in Haskovo Province, in southern Bulgaria.

Geography 
The village of Vis is located in a mountainous area.

References

Villages in Haskovo Province